Jennifer Jill Dunn (née Blackburn; July 29, 1941 – September 5, 2007) was an American politician and engineer who served six terms as a Republican member of the United States House of Representatives from 1993 to 2005, representing .

Early life and education
Born in Seattle, Washington, Dunn grew up in the nearby city of Bellevue, and graduated from Bellevue High School in 1959. She attended the University of Washington, where she was a member of Gamma Phi Beta sorority, before earning a Bachelor of Arts from Stanford University. After graduation, she worked as a systems engineer. She was a distant cousin of congressman Slade Gorton.

Political career
Dunn was chair of the Washington State Republican Party from 1981 to 1992 and twice a delegate to the United Nations Commission on the Status of Women (1984 and 1990).

In 1992, she ran for an open seat in the House, winning 60 percent of the vote. She was Washington's only Republican representative until the Republican Revolution of 1994 when Republicans swept all but two of Washington's nine House seats. In 1998, she became the first woman ever to run for the position of House Majority Leader.
 
Dunn served as vice-chair of the Select Committee on Homeland Security and served on the House Ways and Means Committee and the Joint Economic Committee. On October 10, 2002, Dunn voted in favor of authorizing the War in Iraq.

In 2000, she served on the presidential election exploratory committee for then-Texas Governor George W. Bush.

After Congress
Dunn announced in 2004 she would retire from Congress, choosing not to run for re-election. Her seat was eventually filled by King County Sheriff Dave Reichert. She co-chaired the Information Technology and Innovation Foundation with former Representative Calvin Dooley. She also served as co-chair of the campaign organization "Women for Mitt" for presidential candidate Mitt Romney at the time of her death in 2007. She was succeeded in the Romney organization by U.S. Representative Kay Granger of Fort Worth, Texas.

Personal life
Dunn has two children, including Reagan Dunn, an attorney and politician who has served as a member of the King County Council since 2005.

Dunn collapsed and died of a pulmonary embolism in 2007, in her Alexandria, Virginia, apartment. Her memorial service was held at St. James Cathedral, Seattle.

Electoral history

See also
Women in the United States House of Representatives

References

External links
 
 Washington Secretary of State – History Makers – Jennifer Dunn
 HistoryLink.org – Jennifer Blackburn Dunn (1941–2007)
 

|-

|-

|-

1941 births
2007 deaths
20th-century American politicians
20th-century American women politicians
21st-century American politicians
21st-century American women politicians
State political party chairs of Washington (state)
Deaths from pulmonary embolism
Female members of the United States House of Representatives
Politicians from Seattle
Republican Party members of the United States House of Representatives from Washington (state)
Women in Washington (state) politics
Information Technology and Innovation Foundation
University of Washington Foster School of Business alumni
Stanford Graduate School of Business alumni